Vattaru-dhekunu Kandu is the channel between Meemu Atoll and Vattaru Falhu Atoll of the Maldives.

References
 Divehiraajjege Jōgrafīge Vanavaru. Muhammadu Ibrahim Lutfee. G.Sōsanī.

Channels of the Maldives
Channels of the Indian Ocean